The Sovereign Award is given annually since 1975 by the Jockey Club of Canada to the outstanding horses and people in Canadian Thoroughbred racing. 

The most prestigious award for horses is Sovereign Horse of the Year.

The equivalent in Australia is the Australian Thoroughbred racing awards, in the United States the Eclipse Awards, and in Europe, the Cartier Racing Awards.  

Sovereign Awards are currently given to the:
Canadian Horse of the Year.
Canadian Champion Two-Year-Old Filly
Canadian Champion Two-Year-Old Colt
Canadian Champion Three-Year-Old Filly
Canadian Champion Three-Year-Old Male Horse
Canadian Champion Older Male Horse
Canadian Champion Older Female Horse
Canadian Champion Male Turf Horse
Canadian Champion Female Turf Horse 
Canadian Champion Sprint Horse (1980-2008)
Canadian Champion Male Sprint Horse (2009-present)
Canadian Champion Female Sprint Horse (2009-present)
Sovereign Award for Outstanding Breeder
Sovereign Award for Outstanding Broodmare
Outstanding Jockey
Outstanding Apprentice Jockey
Outstanding Owner
Outstanding Trainer
Outstanding Newspaper Article
Outstanding Feature Article
Outstanding Photograph
Outstanding Film/Video/Broadcast

References
Jockey Club of Canada website

Horse racing awards
Horse racing in Canada